The Carroll Lee Cropper Bridge is a continuous steel arch-shaped  truss bridge over the Ohio River between Indiana and Kentucky. Built between 1968 and 1977, the four-lane arched truss span provides a western Ohio River crossing for the Interstate 275 beltway around the Cincinnati area. The section of Interstate 275 on the Cropper bridge is the only Interstate highway in the Cincinnati, Ohio area that goes between Indiana and Kentucky.

History
The bridge is named for Boone County Judge Carroll Lee Cropper.

Cropper became Boone County judge in 1942 and served for the next 20 years. He was born in a farm house near Bullittsburg Baptist Church in 1897 and graduated from Burlington High School in 1916. He served in World War I and after returning settled on his family farm, eventually becoming a cashier at the Boone County Deposit Bank. He served as a state representative for 12 years beginning in 1934. Upon the death of Judge Nathaniel E. Riddell in 1942, Cropper was appointed to finish the unexpired term. The next year he was elected to his first full term. The position Cropper held is the equivalent of today's county judge/executive; prior to voters' approval of the Judicial Reform Amendment to the state constitution in 1975, and its full implementation at the start of 1978, county judges in Kentucky also had judicial powers.
 
During his terms in office, Cropper witnessed Big Bone Lick becoming a state park, development of the airport now known as Cincinnati/Northern Kentucky International Airport, and the construction of Interstates 71 and 75. It was during Judge Cropper's terms that Boone County began its tremendous population growth. In a Kentucky Post interview in 1974, Cropper said "I'm not against progress, but I actually hate to see farms turn into subdivisions. It spoils the nature of the county. A lot of people are going to want to come here." During his 20 years in office, Judge Cropper saw the county increase in population 250 percent from approximately 10,000 to 25,000.
 
A Democrat, Cropper served as Boone County campaign manager for Franklin Roosevelt's first campaign for the presidency in 1932. He also served as chair of the Boone County Democratic Party. Upon his retirement in 1962, Cropper became president of the People's Deposit Bank and five years later chairman of the board. He died in 1976, and is buried along with his wife Kathryn in Bullittsburg Baptist Cemetery.

See also
 
 
 
 
 List of crossings of the Ohio River

References

Further reading

 Caroll Lee Cropper Bridge at Bridges & Tunnels
 

Bridges over the Ohio River
Bridges completed in 1977
Buildings and structures in Boone County, Kentucky
Continuous truss bridges in the United States
Road bridges in Indiana
Road bridges in Kentucky
Interstate 75
1977 establishments in Kentucky
1977 establishments in Indiana
Bridges on the Interstate Highway System
Steel bridges in the United States
Transportation in Boone County, Kentucky
Transportation buildings and structures in Dearborn County, Indiana